The Jubail International School, also known as Yandhi is a member of the Al-Hussan network of schools, including its sister school Al-Hussan Academy in Al-Khobar, Saudi Arabia. It opened in September 1999 and has KGI to grade 12 with students representing around 18 nationalities. The Saudi Arabia Ministry of Education, General Administration, approves the school for expatriate education. The language of instruction is English. 

The Jubail International School is a university preparatory school educating students primarily for British universities. The first graduating class, in 2002-2003, grade 12, completed course requirements for a high school diploma. In addition to the British IGCSE, A Level and AS Level examinations, students at Jubail International School also have the option to take the American College Board Examinations including the (TOEFL, SAT I, and SAT II examinations. Students also have the option to apply to take the IB Diploma Programme. The school's curriculum, however, maintains a focus on the British system.

History 

The tradition of Al-Hussan education in Saudi Arabia began in 1956 when Sheikh Abdel Aziz Rashid Al-Hussan started the Arab Cultural Institute for adult education. In the following year Al-Hussan Modern Girls School, the first girls’ school in the Eastern Province of Saudi Arabia, was opened.

Accreditation 

The school is endorsed by some of highly respected organisations. These include CITA (Commission on Trans Regional Accreditation) and CIS (Council of International Schools). The school is also the testing centre for British IGCSE, AS Level and  A Level examinations.

Special Achievements 

Two of the students among the six students who excelled in CIE Examination board in Saudi Arabia were from Jubail International School. Georges Obied ranked top in the world in IGCSE Physics. Saman Ishtiaq Malik ranked top in the world in AS Applied ICT.

References 

International schools in Khobar